Pegboard Nerds is a Scandinavian electronic music group, consisting of Norwegian DJ Alexander Odden and Danish DJ Michael Parsberg. The name Pegboard Nerds is an anagram of the duo's surnames, Odden and Parsberg. The duo first met in 2005 and formed the group in 2011. Previously, their records were released under separate projects and both have been producing since the 1990s.

On 21 October 2015, the duo released Pink Cloud to fund breast cancer research which went to number 2 on iTunes Dance Albums, and into the Top 10 on Billboard Dance albums.

In 2015, their collaboration with Jauz, a single titled "Get on Up", was one of the top bass house songs of the year. "Superstar" with Nghtmre and Krewella was the number 1 dubstep song on the Beatport Dubstep Charts of May 2016 and peaked at 28 on Billboards Dance/Mix Show Airplay chart in October 2016. Their collaboration "Deep In The Night" with Montreal-based artist Snails was released in August 2016.

In 2017, the duo released Nerds by Nature with a remix EP being released later that year. The EP reached number 12 on the Top Dance/Electronic Albums Billboard charts and received generally positive reviews.

Chart history

Discography

References

External links

 Official website

21st-century Norwegian musicians
21st-century Danish musicians
DJ duos
Dubstep musicians
Electronic dance music duos
Monstercat artists
Male musical duos
Electronic dance music DJs
Spinnin' Records artists